Hartmut is a given name. Notable people with the name include:

Hartmut of Saint Gall (died 905), Benedictine abbot
Hartmut Bagger (born 1938), retired German general of the Bundeswehr
Hartmut Becker (born 1938), German actor
Hartmut Boockmann (1934–1998), German historian and researcher in medieval history
Hartmut Briesenick (born 1949), East German athlete, mainly men's shot put
Hartmut Büttner, German politician (German Christian Democratic Union)
Hartmut Elsenhans (born 1941), German political scientist, professor at the Universität Leipzig
Hartmut Erbse (1915–2004), German classical philologist
Hartmut Esslinger (born 1944), German-American industrial designer
Hartmut Fähndrich (born 1944), German-Arabic translator
Hartmut Faust (born 1965), West German sprint canoeist
Hartmut Fromm (born 1950), retired German football defender
Hartmut Geerken (born 1939), German musician, composer, writer, journalist, playwright, and filmmaker
Hartmut Gründler (1930–1977), German teacher who burned himself out of protest
Hartmut Haenchen (born 1943), German orchestra conductor
Hartmut Heidemann (born 1941), retired German football player
Hartmut Heinrich (born 1952), German marine geologist and climatologist
Hartmut Honka, German politician (German Christian Democratic Union)
Hartmut Jahreiß, German astronomer associated with Astronomisches Rechen-Institut
Hartmut Jürgens (1955–2017), German mathematician
Hartmut Kallmann (1896–1978), German physicist
Hartmut Konschal (born 1953), German football coach and a former player
Hartmut Krüger (born 1953), former East German handball player
Hartmut Lutz, professor of American and Canadian studies at the University of Greifswald, Germany
Hartmut Möllring, German politician (German Christian Democratic Union)
Hartmut Mehdorn (born 1942), German manager and current CEO of Deutsche Bahn AG
Hartmut Michel, German biochemist and Nobel Laureate
Hartmut Nassauer (born 1942), German politician and Member of the European Parliament for Hesse
Hartmut Neugebauer (born 1941), German actor, voice actor and dialogue director from Poznań, Poland
Hartmut Neven (born 1964), scientist working in computational neurobiology, robotics and computer vision
Hartmut Ostrowski (born 1958), CEO of Bertelsmann AG
Hartmut Pilch (born 1963), founded the Foundation for a Free Information Infrastructure or FFII
Hartmut Schade (born 1954), former football player, who won the 1976 Summer Olympics
Hartmut Schairer (1916–1942), highly decorated Hauptmann in the Luftwaffe during World War II
Hartmut Schreiber (born 1944), German rower
Hartmut Stegemann (1933–2005), German theologian, specialized in Dead Sea Scrolls research
Hartmut Surmann (born 1963), Senior Researcher and Scientist at the IAIS
Hartmut Weber (born 1960), retired West German sprinter who specialized in the 400 metres
Hartmut Wekerle (born 1944), German medical scientist and neurobiologist
Hartmut Wenzel (born 1947), German rower
Hartmut Winkler (born 1953), Professor at the University of Paderborn in Germany
Hartmut Zinser (born 1944), German scholar in religious studies, history of religions, and ethnology

Other uses
Operationsbefehl Hartmut the code word for initiating German submarine operations during Operation Weserübung
2018 British Isles cold wave, also known as Anticyclone Hartmut

See also
1531 Hartmut (1938 SH), a Main-belt Asteroid discovered in 1938

German masculine given names